Konrad Wysocki (born 28 March 1982) is a former Polish-German professional basketball player who played for Ulm, Frankfurt, Oldenburg and Crailsheim in the Basketball Bundesliga. He also had two stints in Poland's top-tier. He retired following the 2018–19 season. Wysocki played a total of 256 games in the German Bundesliga and won 51 caps for the German men's national team. In 2008, he played in the Olympic Games. From 2000 to 2004, he attended Princeton University in the United States, representing the Tigers' men's basketball team in 82 games.

German national team
Wysocki has also been a member of the German national basketball team.

See also
List of Princeton University Olympians

References

External links
Eurobasket.com Profile
FIBA.com Profile

1982 births
Living people
Polish emigrants to Germany
Naturalized citizens of Germany
Basketball players at the 2008 Summer Olympics
BG Göttingen players
Crailsheim Merlins players
EWE Baskets Oldenburg players
German expatriate basketball people in the United States
German men's basketball players
German people of Polish descent
KK Włocławek players
Olympic basketball players of Germany
People from Rzeszów
Princeton Tigers men's basketball players
Polish expatriate basketball people in Germany
Ratiopharm Ulm players
Skyliners Frankfurt players
Small forwards
Sportspeople from Podkarpackie Voivodeship
Turów Zgorzelec players